Golestan (also Romanized as Golestān; also known as Ghargī and Khargī) is a village in Anarestan Rural District, Riz District, Jam County, Bushehr Province, Iran. At the 2006 census, its population was 316, in 63 families.

References 

Populated places in Jam County